KACI (1300 kHz) is an AM radio station broadcasting a News Talk Information format. Licensed to The Dalles, Oregon, United States.  The station is currently owned by Bicoastal Media and the broadcast license is held by Bicoastal Media Licenses IV, LLC.

FM Translator
KACI also broadcasts on an FM translator in The Dalles.

Programming
KACI features programming from Westwood One.

References

External links
FCC History Cards for KACI

ACI
News and talk radio stations in the United States
The Dalles, Oregon
Radio stations established in 1946
1946 establishments in Oregon